Artisornis is a genus of birds in the family Cisticolidae. It contains the following species:
 Red-capped forest warbler, Artisornis metopias
 Long-billed forest warbler, Artisornis moreaui

Taxonomy
The genus Artisornis was introduced in 1928 by the American ornithologist Herbert Friedmann to accommodate the red-capped forest warbler. The name combines the Ancient Greek artēsō meaning "to fasten" with ornis meaning "bird".

References

 
Cisticolidae
Bird genera
Taxa named by Herbert Friedmann